William Gardner (born 1832, date of death unknown) was a Union Navy sailor in the American Civil War and a recipient of the U.S. military's highest decoration, the Medal of Honor, for his actions at the Battle of Mobile Bay.

Background
Born in 1832 in Ireland, Gardner immigrated to the United States and was living in New York when he joined the U.S. Navy. At the Battle of Mobile Bay on August 5, 1864, he "behaved with conspicuous coolness" despite heavy fire. For this action, he was awarded the Medal of Honor four months later, on December 31, 1864. He later obtained the rank of ship's cook.

Gardner's official Medal of Honor citation reads:
As seaman on board the U.S.S. Galena in the engagement at Mobile Bay, 5 August 1864. Serving gallantly during this fierce battle which resulted in the capture of the rebel ram Tennessee and the damaging of Fort Morgan. Gardner behaved with conspicuous coolness under the fire of the enemy.

References 

1832 births
Year of death unknown
Irish emigrants to the United States (before 1923)
People of New York (state) in the American Civil War
Union Navy sailors
United States Navy Medal of Honor recipients
Irish-born Medal of Honor recipients
American Civil War recipients of the Medal of Honor
Irish sailors in the United States Navy